Boundstone may refer to:

 Boundstone (rock), a type of carbonate rock
 A stone marking an historical boundary